Neocnus is an extinct genus of ground sloth, whose species ranged across Cuba and Hispaniola (today split between Haiti and the Dominican Republic). Neocnus would have resembled a typical ground sloth, though much smaller, with a longer tail and a broad trunk, as well as lissome limbs and long claws. This sloth was known for having caudal vertebrae that were broad, a trait shared with other ground sloths, indicating that this animal, like the tamandua of today, likely used its tail to stand upright. The caniniform teeth of the Neocnus were large and triangular, and its skull was deep and had a large, sagittal crest which, when used with the deep mandible likely allowed strong exertion by the masticatory muscles.

The fossils of this sloth were found in Haitian cave deposits. They have been dated to as recently as 4391 BP, calibrated to c. 5000 BP. It is theorized that this sloth, in common with other Antillean sloths, was most likely hunted to extinction by the indigenous peoples of the Caribbean for its pelt and meat. Neocnus is suspected of having been semi-arboreal.

See also

Pilosans of the Caribbean

References

Prehistoric sloths
Pleistocene xenarthrans
Pleistocene mammals of North America
Prehistoric placental genera
Mammals of the Caribbean
Mammals of Hispaniola
Mammals of Cuba
Extinct animals of Haiti
Extinct animals of the Dominican Republic
Mammals of the Dominican Republic
Mammals of Haiti